Polonsky is a surname.  It is quite common in Russia, Ukraine and Belarus.  The name independently appeared in Russia and Ukraine, and in the Polish–Lithuanian Commonwealth, and a little later was used by Polish Jews.  The first mention of the surname comes from 16th century Polish genealogy books as a name of an old Lithuanian family Połoński that belonged to Leliwa coat of arms.  The origin of the name is attributed to Latin polonus 'Polish', or to villages , Polonnoye or Polonsk in modern Belarus.

Notable people with this name include:

Polonsky
Abraham Polonsky (1910–1999), American film director and novelist
Antony Polonsky (born 1940), American professor of Holocaust studies
Arthur Polonsky (born 1925), American painter
David Polonsky (born 1973), Ukraine-born Israeli book illustrator an artistic film director
Gary Polonsky (born 1942), Canadian university president
Leonid Polonsky (1833—1913) Russian writer and journalist 
Marco Polonsky (1930-2002), Russian-Italian linguist
Michael Polonsky (born 1959), American-Australian Marketing Academic
Pinchas Polonsky (born 1958), Russian-Israeli religious philosopher and researcher
Sergei Polonsky (born 1972), Russian businessman
Vitold Polonsky (1879–1919), Russian silent film actor
Vladimir Polonsky (1893–1937), First Secretary of Azerbaijan Communist Party
Yakov Polonsky (1819–1898), Russian Pushkinist poet
Yevgeny Polonsky (died 1919), Ukrainian Red Army soldier

Polonski
Abraham Polonski (born 1913), Russian French Resistance member
Dominik Połoński (1976–2018), Polish cellist

Polonskaya
Elizaveta Polonskaya (1890–1969), Russian poet
Elena Kazimirtchak-Polonskaïa, Soviet astronomer
2006 Polonskaya, a main-belt asteroid, named after the former

See also
 
Polonsky conspiracy, a Bolshevik attempted coup in Ukraine
Polonskyi Raion, a former administrative district in Ukraine

References

Russian-language surnames
Jewish surnames
Yiddish-language surnames
Ukrainian-language surnames
Belarusian-language surnames
Polish-language surnames